Lawrence Elliott Kindt (February 23, 1901 – April 1, 1973) was a farmer economist and served as a Canadian federal politician from 1958 to 1968. He was born in Kiona, Washington, United States.

Kindt first ran for a seat in the House of Commons of Canada in the 1957 federal election.  He was defeated by incumbent Ernest Hansell. Kindt ran again in the 1958 federal election, defeating Hansell to win his first term in office. He was re-elected in the 1962 federal election, the 1963 federal election and the 1965 federal election.

He retired from federal politics in 1968 and died in 1973.

See also
Politics of Canada

External links

 
Lawrence Kindt's obituary at The Lethbridge Herald

1901 births
1973 deaths
People from Benton County, Washington
American emigrants to Canada
Progressive Conservative Party of Canada MPs
Members of the House of Commons of Canada from Alberta